Thudupathi is a town in the taluk of Perundurai in the district of Erode in Tamil Nadu, India. The distance between Perundurai and the village is 5 kilometers and from NH47 it is 2.5 kilometers. It is the site of S.Samy Sound Service & Decorators and Erode Sengunthar Engineering College. There are government elementary and Higher secondary school located which has a proud of producing District level rank holders every year. Below are the list of students who achieved this milestone so far,
1. Gokulakrishnan - HSC District 3rd rank holder
2. Vijayakumar - SSLC District 1st rank holder
3. Kathiravan - HSC District 1st rank holder
4. Madhankumar - HSC District 1st rank holder
5. Vijayakumar - HSC District 2nd rank holder
This village holds an ancient Perumal temple. There are engineering colleges, medical colleges, auditing colleges located around this village.

Etymology
The word "Thudupathi" has emerged from the union of  two Tamil words "Thuduppu" meaning bouquet of flowers and "Pathi" meaning town.

Township
The town of Thudupathi encloses the following 12 villages:
1. Palakkarai
2. Thudupathi North
3. Thudupathi South
4.T. Olappalayam
5. Thulukkapalayam
6. Thoppu palayam
7. Goundam palayam
8. Sanarpalayam
9. Chinnamallampalayam
10. Pallapalayam
11. Veerachipalayam
12. SeerangaGoundanPalayam

Villages in Erode district